Batheay may refer to:

 Batheay District, a district of Kampong Cham Province, Cambodia
 Batheay Commune, a commune of Batheay District, Cambodia; see Communes of Cambodia